On 10 February 1995 at 16:09 CET, the first Antonov An-70 prototype aircraft collided with an Antonov An-72 that was assisting with the An-70 test program over Borodianka Raion in Ukraine. All seven crew members on board the An-70 were killed; the An-72 was able to make a safe emergency landing at Gostomel Airport in Kyiv with no fatalities.

Causes
A Ukrainian-led commission reported that the cause was human error and blamed the flight maneuvers by the crew as the major contributing factor to the crash. Leonid Berestov is quoted as saying "The careless actions of both crews in their formation flying led to a collision and crash.

Several faults were observed in the three test flights that took place before the accident flight, including flight control problems during the second flight and again during the third flight, on the day preceding the crash.

References

Bibliography

 Светлая память погибшим // Авиация и Время. — К. : 1995. — No. 1. — С. 25. (Obituary in Aviatsiya i Vremia journal, including photogallery of the crew).
 
 
 
 

Aviation accidents and incidents in Ukraine
Antonov
1995 in Ukraine 
1995 disasters in Ukraine 
History of Kyiv Oblast
February 1995 events in Europe